Fabio León Jaramillo Mesa (born April 19, 1967 in Itagüí, Antioquia) is a retired male road cyclist from Colombia, who was a professional in the 1990s. He is a younger brother of Carlos Jaramillo.

Career

1992
1st in Stage 6 Vuelta a Colombia, Medellín (COL)

References
 

1967 births
Living people
People from Itagüí
Colombian male cyclists
Vuelta a Colombia stage winners
Sportspeople from Antioquia Department